The decade of the 1280s in art involved some significant events.

Events

Paintings

 1285: Duccio paints Rucellai Madonna for Santa Maria Novella (now in the Uffizi)

Births
 1289: Zhao Yong – Chinese painter in Yuan dynasty (died c. 1360)
 1289: Gu An – Chinese painter in Yuan dynasty (died 1365)
 1287: Tang Di – Chinese landscape painter during the Yuan dynasty (died 1368)
 1287: Wang Mian – Chinese painter of plums during the Yuan dynasty (died 1359)
 1284: Simone Martini – Italian painter born in Siena (died 1344)
 1282: Li Shixing – Chinese landscape painter during the Yuan dynasty (died 1328)
 1280: Pietro Lorenzetti – Italian painter (died 1348)
 1280: Tino di Camaino – Italian sculptor (died 1337)
 1280: Bernardo Daddi – early Italian renaissance painter and apprentice of Giotto (died 1348)
 1280: Wu Zhen – Chinese painter during the Yuan dynasty (died 1354)
 1280: Ugolino di Nerio – Italian painter most active in Siena (died 1349)

Deaths
 1285: Robert of Beverley – British mason and sculptor (born unknown)
 1284: Nicola Pisano – Italian sculptor whose work is noted for its classical Roman sculptural style (born 1220/1225)

 
Years of the 13th century in art
Art